SCY1-like protein 2 is a protein that in humans is encoded by the SCYL2 gene.

References

Further reading